The 2020 Nagorno-Karabakh ceasefire agreement is an armistice agreement that ended the Second Nagorno-Karabakh War. It was signed on 9November by the President of Azerbaijan Ilham Aliyev, the Prime Minister of Armenia Nikol Pashinyan and the President of Russia Vladimir Putin, and ended all hostilities in the Nagorno-Karabakh region from 00:00, 10 November 2020 Moscow time. The president of the self-declared Republic of Artsakh, Arayik Harutyunyan, also agreed to an end of hostilities. Armenian Prime Minister Nikol Pashinyan did not join the video conference between the Azerbaijani and Russian leaders as can be seen from the available footage.

Background

Renewed hostilities between Azerbaijan and Artsakh together with Armenia began on 27 September 2020. Azerbaijan recovered many of its territories during the following six weeks which culminated in the capture of the strategically important town Shusha and prompted the two sides to agree to a ceasefire deal on 9November 2020.

Overview
According to the agreement, both belligerent parties agreed to exchange prisoners of war and the dead. The Armenian forces were to withdraw from Armenian-occupied territories surrounding Nagorno-Karabakh by 1December 2020. Armenia lost roughly 75% of the territories in and around Nagorno-Karabakh that it controlled prior to the war. An approximately 2,000-strong Russian peacekeeping force from the Russian Ground Forces was to be deployed to the region for a minimum of five years, one of its task being protection of the Lachin corridor, the only remaining passage between Armenia and Republic of Artsakh. Additionally, Armenia undertook to "guarantee safety" of transport links between mainland Azerbaijan and its Nakhchivan exclave. Russian FSB′s Border Troops would exercise control over the transport connections.

Terms of the agreement

Reactions

Armenia

After signing the agreement, Prime Minister of Armenia Nikol Pashinyan said, "This is not a victory, but there is not defeat until you consider yourself defeated, we will never consider ourselves defeated and this shall become a new start of an era of our national unity and rebirth." Violent protests erupted in Yerevan following the announcement of the ceasefire agreement. The speaker of the Parliament of Armenia, Ararat Mirzoyan, was beaten by an angry mob who stormed the Parliament after the peace deal was announced. Pashinyan has indicated, however, that Mirzoyan's life is "not under threat" and he had undergone surgery.

Azerbaijan

The President of Azerbaijan Ilham Aliyev reacted to the agreement by saying, "This statement constitutes Armenia's capitulation. This statement puts an end to the years-long occupation." Large-scale celebrations erupted throughout Azerbaijan, most notably in its capital city of Baku when news of the agreement was announced.

International

Countries
  France said the cessation of hostilities was crucial, urged Azerbaijan to abide by the terms of the agreement and affirmed its friendship with Armenia.
  The president of Georgia, Salome Zurabishvili, congratulated Armenia and Azerbaijan for agreeing to end hostilities, offered condolences to the families of victims of the war and hoped a new era will start in the South Caucasus.
  Iran welcomed the agreement and hoped it will lead to a final settlement which will preserve peace in the region.
  Moldova's Ministry of Foreign Affairs and European Integration communicated that the country welcomed the accords with satisfaction and that Moldova supported the search of a lasting peaceful solution in the region based on international norms and principles.
  The Pakistani foreign minister issued a statement saying "We congratulate the government and brotherly people of Azerbaijan on the liberation of their territories."
  Russian President Vladimir Putin said, "We presume that the agreements reached will set up necessary conditions for the lasting and full-format settling of the Nagorno-Karabakh crisis on the basis of justice and to the benefit of Armenian and Azerbaijan peoples."
  Turkish Foreign minister Mevlüt Çavuşoğlu congratulated Azerbaijan following the signing of the agreement.
  The United Kingdom's Foreign Secretary Dominic Raab welcomed the agreement and encouraged both sides to continue to work towards a lasting settlement to the dispute.

Organizations
  The European Union welcomed cessation of hostilities and hoped continued negotiations would lead to a sustainable settlement.
  The Secretary-General of the Turkic Council congratulated Azerbaijan for its "historical achievement of liberation of its occupied territories and restoring sovereignty over them".
  A spokesperson for United Nations Secretary-General Antonio Guterres said, "The Secretary-General is relieved that the deal has been agreed to on the cessation of hostilities. Our consistent focus has been on the well-being of civilians, on humanitarian access, and on protecting lives, and we hope that this will now be achieved consistent with the previous important efforts of the Minsk [Group] Co-Chairs."

Aftermath

Armenian evacuation

Since 13 November 2020, Armenians in Kalbajar, a district that was mostly inhabited by ethnic Azerbaijanis before the First Nagorno-Karabakh War and was settled by Armenian citizens after it, started to burn their homes and cut trees before leaving for Armenia, to avoid them being reinhabited by the Azerbaijanis. Some Armenians also took their dead relatives' remains with them, while others were carting off everything they could as trucks nearby loaded up with household possessions and cut down trees. Agence France-Presse reported that in Charektar, at least six houses were set on fire. On 15 November, at Armenia's request, Azerbaijan extended the deadline for Armenians to fully vacate Kalbajar District by 10 days, until 25 November. Azerbaijan's Presidential Office stated that they took the worsening weather and the fact that there was only one road to Armenia into consideration when agreeing to extend the deadline. Azerbaijani authorities also denounced civilians and de-mobilized soldiers leaving the area for burning houses and committing what they called "ecological terror".

Deployment of Russian peacekeepers

As early as on 10 November 2020, Russian troops and armour that were to constitute a peacekeeping force under the agreement, were reported to be moving into in the region of Nagorno-Karabakh. The force was reported to have been transported to Armenia by air before the agreement was signed.  By 12 November, the Russian force consisted mostly of the personnel of the 15th Separate Motor Rifle Brigade had entered Stepanakert and begun deploying observation posts across the region.

Exchange of POWs and detainees

In December 2020, Armenia and Azerbaijan have begun exchanging groups of prisoners of war mediated by Russia. As of February 2021, 63 prisoners, including civilians, returned to Armenia, and 15 were returned to Azerbaijan. In March 2021, Human Rights Watch (HRW), reported that Azerbaijan has repatriated 69 POWs.

After the ceasefire, following skirmishes in mid-December 2020, Azerbaijan detained a group of 62 Armenian soldiers. Azerbaijani authorities claimed that the soldiers are not POWs but members of a "sabotage group", and criminal charges will be brought against them. However, European Parliament resolution concluded that credible reports have surfaced of Armenian service personnel and civilians being been kidnapped since the cease-fire on 10 November, and that Azerbaijani forces detained civilians despite the lack of evidence that they posed a security threat that could justify their detention under international humanitarian law. Notably, Maral Najaryan, a recent Lebanese-Armenian emigrant to Shushi in Nagorno-Karabakh who went missing in the last days of the war, was among the detainees. Ani Najaryan, Najaryan's sister, told Radio Free Europe that she had moved to Karabakh after Beirut's massive explosion. Her Lebanese ancestry has been used by the Azerbaijani media to suggest that she was a "mercenary" fighting for the Armenians.

On 14 April 2021, a global campaign was launched among the Armenian diaspora to demand the release of Armenian POWs and other detainees held in Azerbaijan. Protests were held in 14 cities around the world, including Toronto, Paris, Rome, Houston, Sacramento, Montréal, New York, Los Angeles, Warsaw, Berlin, Hamburg and Moscow. According to Armenian authorities, as of April 2021, over 200 Armenian POWs are currently being held captive by Azerbaijan. On 20 May 2021, the European Parliament adopted a resolution urging Azerbaijan to immediately and unconditionally release all the Armenian prisoners, both military and civilian, detained during or after the conflict. In June the Armenian substitute member of the Parliamentary Assembly of the Council of Europe (PACE) Tatevik Hayrapetyan raised concern of the situation of the Armenian POWs in the PACE, as in a discussion between the Ilham Aliyev and Emine Erdoğan, the first lady of Turkey where both appeared to be pleased by the fact that there exist Armenian POWs and the latter suggested a release of them in several stages. On 22 July 2021, 13 Armenian servicemen were sentenced to 6 years imprisonment and charged with "terrorism" and "illegally entering Azerbaijan".

On 22 September 2021, the U.S. House of Representatives passed the Amendment, demanding Azerbaijan's immediate release of about 200 Armenian POWs, hostages and detained persons, "misrepresenting their status in an attempt to justify their continued captivity".

Human Rights Watch reported that Azerbaijani armed forces mistreated Armenian POWs,  subjecting them to  physical abuse and humiliation. “The abuse, including torture of detained Armenian soldiers, is abhorrent and a war crime,” said Hugh Williamson, Europe and Central Asia director at Human Rights Watch. “It is also deeply disturbing that a number of missing Armenian soldiers were last seen in Azerbaijan’s custody and it has failed to account for them.”

Russian-Turkish monitoring centre 
Following the signing of the agreement and the deployment of the Russian peacekeepers, a memorandum on establishing a joint Russian-Turkish monitoring centre in Azerbaijan was signed by Russian and Turkish defence ministers. Russia, however, insisted that Turkey's involvement would be limited to operating remotely from the monitoring centre on Azerbaijani soil outside of Nagorno-Karabakh, and that Turkish peacekeepers would not go to Nagorno-Karabakh.

Unblocking transport connections 
As of late 2021, the fate of the "transport connections" the article 9 of the ceasefire agreement provisioned is still uncertain. A working group on unblocking communications led by deputy prime ministers of Azerbaijan, Armenia, and Russia was established in January 2021, but no significant progress has been made. Although not discussed in the trilateral negotiations, Azerbaijan has kept insisting on its plans of implementing "Zangezur corridor", which would entail a transport corridor connecting Nakhchivan to the rest of Azerbaijan via Armenia's Syunik Province. Analytics pointed out that Azerbaijan's ambitions are aimed at creating a geopolitical corridor under the pretext of regional connectivity. In May 2021, Pashinyan said that while Armenia is keen on opening transport links as means of direct railway communication with Iran and Russia, it is not willing to discuss any 'corridor logic’. The dispute has been cited as one of the reasons for the 2021 Armenia–Azerbaijan border crisis. In September, Russian deputy prime minister Alexei Overchuk insisted that the trilateral group has not discussed "corridors". In October 2021, Azerbaijan unilaterally began using Armenia's airspace, conducting flights to its Nakhchivan exclave.

A new round of Russian-mediated negotiations on restoring economic links between their countries began between Armenia and Azerbaijani deputy prime ministers on 20 October, where legal aspects of opening the Armenian-Azerbaijani border for commercial traffic were discussed. The sides have made progress towards restoring their Soviet-era rail links according to Armenian deputy prime minister. On 5 November 2021, Russian vice prime minister Alexey Overchuk and Russian Ministry of Foreign Affairs announced that the routes created after unblocking all the regional communications between Armenia and Azerbaijan will be under jurisdiction of the country the territory of which they cross pass through.

Nikol Pashinyan and Ilham Aliyev met in Brussels on 15 December 2021 and discussed unblocking regional communications among other issues. The meeting was arranged and moderated by the President of European Council Charles Michel, who after the meeting stated that the leaders of Armenia and Azerbaijan managed to come to agreement regarding opening the rail routes, but not automobile roads. After the meeting Pashinyan and Aliyev confirmed the agreement on the restoration of the railway communication. “The railway will operate in accordance with internationally recognized border and customs regulations on a reciprocal basis under the sovereignty and jurisdiction of the countries. Armenia will have access by rail to the Islamic Republic of Iran and the Russian Federation”  the press service of Prime Minister of Armenia reported after the meeting.

Follow-up statements 
The leaders of Armenia, Azerbaijan and Russia met twice in 2021, issuing statements to confirm continued adherence to the 2020 ceasefire agreement and to elaborate on its implementation.

The joint trilateral statement issued in Moscow on 11 January 2021 stated:

The joint trilateral statement issued in Sochi on 26 November 2021 stated:

"3 + 3 platform" 
After the end of the war, Turkey and Azerbaijan proposed "3+3" – a platform for collaboration between the three South Caucasian countries  – Azerbaijan, Armenia and Georgia and the three regional powers – Turkey, Russia and Iran. The first consultative meeting of the platform attended by deputy foreign ministers took place on 10 December 2021. Georgia, also invited, declined to participate, citing Russian occupation of South Ossetia and Abkhazia as a reason. Armenia announced that it is willing to participate if only the questions discussed are not already agreed on or discussed in other formats, including the issue of Nagorno-Karabakh.

References

External links
 

2020 in Azerbaijan
2020 in the Republic of Artsakh
November 2020 events in Armenia
November 2020 events in Russia
November 2020 events in Asia
November 2020 events in Europe
Treaties concluded in 2020
Treaties of Armenia
Treaties of Azerbaijan
Treaties of the Republic of Artsakh
Treaties of Russia
Nagorno-Karabakh conflict
Aftermath of the 2020 Nagorno-Karabakh war
Ceasefires
Armenia–Azerbaijan relations
Armenia–Russia relations
Azerbaijan–Russia relations
Vladimir Putin
Nikol Pashinyan
Ilham Aliyev